Missan Oil Company (MOC) is a state-owned oil and gas company located in the Maysan Governorate, Iraq. The headquarters are located in the capital of the province, Amarah.

Missan was spun off from South Oil Company in 2008 to expand oil activities in Maysan and to set up and oversee joint ventures with international companies to develop the province's oil fields.

The split from South Oil was seen as a political move and aroused international debates.

History
Following the spin-off from South Oil in 2008, Missan initiated an international consortium to develop the Zubair oil field. As part of a series of international licensing rounds, the 20-year deal was finalized in 2010, with companies Eni (32.81%), Occidental Petroleum (23.44%) and Korea Gas Corporation (18.75%) holding stakes in the venture.

In 2009, as part of the second round of post-war oilfield bidding held by the Iraqi government, South Oil (25%) awarded a major contract to CNPC (37.5%), Total (18.75%), and Petronas (18.75%) to develop the major Halfaya oilfield. After the deal was completed, MOC took over operations and ownership from South Oil, and the final 20-year contract was signed in January 2012.

In 2010, MOC signed technical service contracts with CNPC and CNOOC. In 2011, Missan Oil signed another contract with Shell (45%) and Petronas (30%), to develop the Majnoon oil field in the Basra region.

In 2013, MOC announced the completion of four new production wells in the Halfaya oil field.

Organization
Managing Director Ali Muarij was reported to have been removed from the post in June 2011 after being charged with bad administration and failure to achieve higher oil production results during his tenure. However, as of mid-2012 press reports suggested he was still in his post as head of the company.

In 2014, Adnan Noshi was assigned by the Iraqi Oil Ministry as the new head of MOC.

Operations
The Maysan Oil Company (MOC) is responsible for fields in the Maysan province which include six producing fields (Bazergan, Abu-Gharb, Fakka and Halfaya), as well as Majnoon, which it operates in partnership with the South Oil Company. Maysan also holds five discovered but unproducing fields, including the Huweiza, al-Rafi’e, East Rafidan, Dujeila and Kumait fields.

Operated Oilfields 
Halfaya oilfield is one of the seven biggest oilfields in Iraq, with proven reserves of around 4.1 billion barrels.

See also

 Iraq oil law (2007)
 North Oil Company
 South Oil Company

References

External links
 Official Web Site

Oil and gas companies of Iraq
Government-owned companies of Iraq
Iraqi companies established in 2008